Shark Tale is a 2004 video game based on the film of the same name that was released on PlayStation 2, Microsoft Windows, Game Boy Advance, GameCube and Xbox. The Game Boy Advance version was also released on a Twin Pack cartridge bundled with Shrek 2 in 2005. The game received mixed to positive reception from critics.

Gameplay
The player plays Oscar, a fish who decides to lie about his abilities to become wealthy and famous by fighting with his shark friend as the 'Sharkslayer'. The game shares a similar plot to the film. There are 25 different missions set in movie-based locations. The game features several gameplay styles, including an exploration mode, action/fighting sequences, racing challenges, and music sequences.

Plot
Oscar had a nightmare where he is being chased by a hungry shark. He was woken up by Mrs. Sanchez and is kicked out from her apartment by repofish as he didn't pay their rent to them. Oscar then has to save all the items from falling before they are destroyed. He then removes all graffiti that had messages making fun of him, only to find out that a group of fish called The Shorties were just making up that message for another Oscar who lives by the canals. Oscar then tells The Shorties to remove the graffiti before the police arrive. Oscar later stages a dance party through the news reporter, Katie Current to prove that he can defeat sharks. After he is done dancing, Sykes, Oscar's boss, arrives and tells him to be in the Whale Wash on time before he does, leading to a taxi fish chase all over the city. Arriving at the Whale Wash, he sees that Sykes has snuck in first and Oscar must avoid detection from the Whale Wash guards to get to work on time before he can get fired.

Reception

Shark Tale received "mixed or average reviews" on all platforms according to the review aggregation website Metacritic.  In Japan, where the PlayStation 2, Game Boy Advance, and GameCube versions were released by Taito in March 2005, Famitsu gave it a score of one seven, one eight, and one seven for the PlayStation 2 version; and two sixes, one seven, and one six for the Game Boy Advance version.

References

External links

2004 video games
Activision games
Game Boy Advance games
GameCube games
PlayStation 2 games
Single-player video games
Underwater civilizations in fiction
Vicarious Visions games
Video games based on films
Video games developed in the United States
Video games scored by Kevin Manthei
Video games with underwater settings
Windows games
Xbox games
Amaze Entertainment games